Krishnapur may refer to:

Places

India
 Kishunpur, a town in Fatehpur district, Uttar Pradesh
 Krishnapur, a village in Jaunpur district, Uttar Pradesh
 Uttar Krishnapur Part-I, a census town in the Cachar district of Assam
 Krishnapur, a village in Medak district, Telangana, India
 Krishnapura, Karnataka, a village in the Dakshina Kannada district, Karnataka
 Krishnapur (Vidhan Sabha constituency), a constituency for the Tripura Legislative Assembly

West Bengal
 Kestopur or Krishnapur, a locality in Bidhannagar Municipal Corporation, West Bengal
 Krishnapur, West Bengal, a town in the Hooghly district of West Bengal
 Krishnapur, Murshidabad, a village in the Murshidabad district of West Bengal
 Krishnapur, Malda, a census town in Malda district of West Bengal
 Krishnapur, Mandirbazar, a village in South 24 Parganas district of West Bengal

Nepal
 Krishnapur, Nepal, a village development committee in the Kanchanpur District of Mahakali Zone
 Krishnapur Birta, a village development committee in the Siraha District of Sagarmatha Zone

Other
 The Siege of Krishnapur, a novel by James Gordon Farrell
 Krishnapura matha, a matha one of the Ashta Mathas of Udupi in Udupi City, Karnataka

See also
 Krishnapura
 Krishnapuram (disambiguation)
 Krishnapatnam